Cleeve Park School was formed in 1986 by the merger of Parklands School for Boys and Sidcup School for Girls. The new mixed school was formed on the site of Parklands School on its current location in Bexley Lane. Mrs Evelyne Hinde was the first head Teacher of Cleeve Park School and oversaw its formation.

The school is set in extensive grounds on the edge of the Footscray Meadows. The original Parklands school building dates back to 1950 and that building still forms part of the current school. The building has been extended and developed several times over the years most notably with a new wing added in 1990 and then a further section in 1995, both opened by the then MP for Bexley Sir Edward Heath.

Cleeve Park was a local authority community school until 31 August 2012. On 1 September 2012 the school was a converter academy and joined The Kemnal Academies Trust.

As of early 2019, a further expansion to create a new set of buildings for 100 new special educational needs students has been constructed.

References

External links
 
 The Kemnal Academies Trust
 Latest OFSTED report – 2015 Performance Tables

Secondary schools in the London Borough of Bexley
Educational institutions established in 1967
1967 establishments in England
Academies in the London Borough of Bexley
Buildings and structures in Sidcup